Portrait of Anna van der Aar is an oil-on-panel painting by the Dutch Golden Age painter Frans Hals, painted in 1626 and now in the Metropolitan Museum of Art, in New York. It is considered a pendant portrait to that of her husband, the writer Petrus Scriverius.

Painting 
This painting was documented by Hofstede de Groot in 1910, who wrote:225. ANNA VAN DER AAR (born in 1576), wife of Petrus Scriverius. B. 66; M. 73. Half-length; in a painted oval. She is turned three-quarters left. Her right hand is on her bosom. She wears a black dress embroidered with gold, a white cap, and a large ruff. [Pendant to 224.] Inscribed in the right centre, "Ao AETAT 50," and below on the painted frame signed with the monogram and the date 1626; panel, 8 1/2 inches by 6 inches. Engraved by Adrien Didier in the Wilson catalogue. 
In the collection of M. J. Caan van Maurik, Oudewater. Sales. John W. Wilson of Brussels, Paris, March 14, 1881 see 1873 catalogue, p. 82 (80,000 francs, with pendant). 
E. Secretan, Paris, July I, 1889, No. 125 (91,000 francs, with pendant). In the collection of the late H. O. Havemeyer, New York.

Pendants

References

Frans Hals, by Seymour Slive, 1974 a catalog raisonné of Hals works by Seymour Slive: Volume Three, the catalogue, National gallery of Art: Kress Foundation, Studies in the History of European Art, London - Phaidon Press, 1974 on Anna van der Aar; catalog number 37, page 23

van der Aar
Paintings in the collection of the Metropolitan Museum of Art
van der Aar
1626 paintings